Barry Edward Smith (April 25, 1955 – September 7, 2013) was a Canadian former NHL player for the Boston Bruins and the Colorado Rockies.

Career 
Smith was drafted 32nd overall by the Boston Bruins in the 1975 NHL Amateur Draft. He played a total of 114 regular season games, scoring seven goals and seven assists for 14 points. He was also drafted 36th overall by Edmonton Oilers in the 1975 WHA Amateur Draft but never played in that league. 

After retiring from playing he became a coach in the ECHL for the Knoxville Cherokees, for five seasons between 1992 and 1997. He was replaced midseason in his fifth season by Jack Capuano. He coached again from 2000 to 2001, helming the San Angelo Outlaws of the WPHL in their final season before the league folded. Smith died in September 2013 at the age of 58.

Career statistics

Regular season and playoffs

International

References

External links

1955 births
2013 deaths
Birmingham Bulls (CHL) players
Boston Bruins draft picks
Boston Bruins players
Canadian ice hockey centres
Colorado Rockies (NHL) players
Edmonton Oilers (WHA) draft picks
Estevan Bruins players
Fort Worth Texans players
Ice hockey people from British Columbia
New Westminster Bruins players
Rochester Americans players
Sportspeople from Surrey, British Columbia
Vancouver Nats players